The 42nd Blue Dragon Film Awards ceremony was held on November 26, 2021 at KBS Hall in Yeouido, Seoul. Organized by Sports Chosun (a sister brand of Chosun Ilbo). It was aired live on KBS2 at 20:30 (KST). 18 categories were awarded at the 42nd edition of awards ceremony, hosted by Kim Hye-soo (28th time) and Yoo Yeon-seok (4th time). The nominations for 15 categories were announced for the 172 Korean films released from October 30, 2020 to October 14, 2021 on November 1, 2021. Escape from Mogadishu got 13 nominations in 10 categories, and won 6 awards including best film, popular film and popular star awards.

Event
 42nd Blue Dragon Film Awards Short Film Competition: From October 6 to October 15, 2021.

Nominees and winners 
The nominees for the 42nd Blue Dragon Film Awards were announced on November 1, 2021.

Winners are listed first, highlighted in boldface, and indicated with a double dagger.

Multiple nominations and awards
The following films received multiple nominations:

Performances

Gallery

See also 
 57th Baeksang Arts Awards
 56th Grand Bell Awards
 30th Buil Film Awards
 15th Asian Film Awards
 26th Chunsa Film Art Awards

References

External links 
  
 42nd Blue Dragon Film Awards at Daum 

Blue Dragon Film Awards
Blue Dragon Film Awards
Blue Dragon Film Awards
Blue Dragon Film Awards